David Mahlobo (born 14 January 1972) is a South African politician and Deputy Ministry of Human Settlements, Water and Sanitation. He is a former Minister of Energy and former Minister of State Security.

Early life
David Mahlobo was born on 14 January 1972 on a farm called Bergplaas, KwaNdwalaza, close to Piet Retief in the current province of Mpumalanga in South Africa. He is the son of Chief Mandlenkosi Mahlobo, chief of the KwaMahlobo Traditional Community in Mpumalanga. Subject to forced removals during the apartheid era, he and his siblings would spend the earlier years of their lives in Swaziland.

Education
He returned to South Africa in 1983 and attended school and graduating from Bambanani High School in 1991. He would later attend the University of Zululand where he attained a BSc degree in Microbiology and Biochemistry in 1998 and in 1999 received a BSc Honours degree in biochemistry. While at the University of Zululand he was active in the students' representative council and elected as secretary general for two terms as well as working for the ANC, ANCYL and South African Students Congress.

Political career
After the unbanning of the ANC, Mahlobo worked as a recruiter for the organization, mobilizing the farming communities around Piet Retief and Pongola and helping to organize the party's structures in these regions. Joining the South African civil service in 2002, he was appointed the Director of Transformation in the Department of Water Affairs and Forestry until 2009. Then in 2009, he was appointed as Head of the Department of Co-operative Governance and Traditional Affairs in Mpumalanga Province, a position he held until mid-2014.

At the ANCs party conference at Mangaung in 2012, Mahlobo was appointed to the organisation's National Executive Committee (NEC). His appointment to the NEC surprised some, attributing it either to his ten-year relationship with Jacob Zuma or the premier of Mpumalanga, David Mabuza. In the NEC, he would participate on the National Working Committees for peace and stability and organisation building; did work for the NEC in both Gauteng and Free State provinces and was assigned to the transition team in 2013 that reformed the ANC Youth League after Julius Malema was asked to resign the position, prior to the latter's expulsion from the ANC. On the 25 May 2014, President Zuma appointed Mahlobo to the cabinet as Minister of State Security, a position he held until 2017.

On 17 October 2017, President Jacob Zuma reshuffled his cabinet with Mahlobo being appointed Minister of Energy. With the proposed $74 billion Russian nuclear energy contract with South Africa, negotiated by Zuma in 2014, ruled unlawful and unconstitutional in April 2017 by the Western Cape High Court, Zuma needed a loyal ally to push through the contract and Mahlobo was seen as that person. In February 2018, Cyril Ramaphosa assumed the South African presidency from Jacob Zuma, he would shuffle his cabinet later that month and Mahlobo lost his ministerial position. The High Level Review Panel appointed by President Ramaphosa in June 2018 cited as its key finding in December 2018 that the Minister had presided over the State Security Agency (SSA) at a time when it showed "an almost complete disregard for the constitution, policy, legislation and other prescripts...turning our civilian intelligence community into a private resource to serve the political and personal interests of particular individuals". The report further recommended that criminal activities and breaches of the law be investigated. After Cyril Ramaphosa's ANC won the 2019 South African Election, his new cabinet was announced on 29 May 2019 and reincluded Mahlobo but as one of two deputy ministers in the Ministry of Human Settlements, Water and Sanitation.

Alleged rhino horn smuggling
Mahlobo has been linked to a Chinese syndicate involved in rhino poaching and horn smuggling. Rhino horn smuggler Guan Jiang Guang appeared in an Al Jazeera documentary showing a picture  of himself and Mahlobo, calling the minister his friend, however Mahlobo has denied the allegations saying he was going to Guang for a spa treatment. As of November 2016, Mahlobo is being investigated by the South African elite police unit, the Hawks (South Africa) because of allegations made by Guan Jiang Guang, a self-professed rhino horn trader, that he was close to the minister and his wife. Mahlobo has denied all association with the man except for visiting his massage spa.

References

Living people
1971 births
Government ministers of South Africa
Members of the National Assembly of South Africa